Game is a 1993 Indian Bollywood action crime drama film directed by Anil Mattoo and produced by Romesh Sharma and starring Naseeruddin Shah, Aditya Pancholi, Rahul Roy and Sangeeta Bijlani in the pivotal roles.

Cast
Naseeruddin Shah as Vikram
Aditya Pancholi as Raja
Rahul Roy as Vijay
Sangeeta Bijlani as Advocate Shraddha
Suresh Oberoi as Inspector Pawar
Kulbhushan Kharbanda as Barrister Singh Chowdhry
Kiran Kumar as Qamaal Khan
Mahesh Anand as Afzal Khan
Alok Nath as Inspector Patil
Mahavir Shah as Peter D'Souza
Arjun as Raghu, Raja's Group Friend 
Uday Tikekar as Satish,Raja's Group Friend 
Johnny Lever as Jaggu,Raja's Group Friend 
Pankaj Berry as Ajay, Vikram's younger brother.
Arun Bakshi as Vikram's father
Rita Bhaduri as Vikram's mother
Abhijeet Sandhu as Young Vikram
Dolly Minhas as Meghna
Rajesh Puri as Nachani Builder
Jalees Sherwani as Ayub Khan
Tiku Talsania as Kamal
Sahila Chadha as in a special appearance in "Macho Man"

Soundtrack

References

External links
 

1993 films
1990s Hindi-language films
Indian crime drama films
Indian action drama films
Films about organised crime in India
1990s action drama films
1993 crime drama films